The Neale Baronetcy, of Wollaston in the County of Northampton, was a title in the Baronetage of England. It was created on 26 February 1646 for William Neale, a Royalist soldier. The title became extinct on his death in 1691.

Neale baronets, of Wollaston (1646)
Sir William Neale, 1st Baronet (died 1691)

References

External links

Extinct baronetcies in the Baronetage of England